Savage Life is the debut studio album by American rapper Webbie. It was released on July 5, 2005, by Trill Entertainment, Asylum Records, and Atlantic Records. The album lead single, "Give Me That" became a certified as gold by the Recording Industry Association of America (RIAA) in the United States. The album debuted at number eight on the US Billboard 200, with 68,000 copies sold in its first week.

Track listing

Charts

Weekly charts

Year-end charts

References

Webbie albums
2005 debut albums
Albums produced by Mannie Fresh